Tolo Bay or the Bay of Tolo may refer to either of:

 Bay of Tolo in Indonesia, between the eastern and southeastern peninsulas of Sulawesi
 Bay of Tolo or Tolon in Greece ( or Modern ), part of the Argolic Gulf between the Argolid and the main Peleponnese